Sixth Street (formerly known as TSSP) is a global investment firm with $60 billion in assets under management. The firm operates nine investment platforms across its growth investing, adjacencies, direct lending, fundamental public strategies, infrastructure, special situations, agriculture and par liquid credit businesses. Sixth Street invests in the equity and debt of public and private companies, acquires real estate, finances infrastructure projects, and provides start-up capital to new businesses. Sixth Street has been noted in the financial media for the unusual structure of its largest fund, which is open-ended and able to hold longer-term investments.

Notable investments

FC Barcelona 
In July 2022, Sixth Street acquired rights to 25% of FC Barcelona's income from LaLiga TV over the next 25 years. The deal was worth €207.5 million for the initial 10% stake and an additional €310 million for the other 15%.

San Antonio Spurs 
In June 2021, Sixth Street acquired a 20% stake in the San Antonio Spurs. They were joined by Michael Dell, who acquired a 10% stake.

Caris Life Sciences 
Sixth Street led an $830 million growth-equity round for precision oncology company Caris Life Sciences in May 2021. Sixth Street had previously invested in the company in 2018 and 2020.

Legends 
In January 2021, Sixth Street acquired a majority interest in Legends Hospitality, a sports and live entertainment services company co-founded by affiliates of the New York Yankees and Dallas Cowboys.

Talcott Resolution 
In January 2021, Sixth Street acquired Talcott Resolution, the former life insurance and annuity business of The Hartford, for more than $2 billion.

Airbnb 
In Spring 2020, Sixth Street co-led a $1 billion equity and debt investment in online travel marketplace Airbnb.

Airtrunk 
In 2017, Sixth Street and Goldman Sachs invested equity and provided debt financing for the creation of Sydney-based AirTrunk, one of the leading data center businesses in the Asia Pacific region. In April 2020, AirTrunk was acquired by Maquarie Infrastructure and Real Assets (MIRA) for A$3 billion.

Spotify 
In the spring of 2016, the firm co-led an investment consortium that invested $1 billion in music-streaming service Spotify Ltd. through debt convertible to equity.

Credit Suisse 
In May 2016, Sixth Street purchased a $1.27 billion portfolio of debt and equity investments related to 170 different companies from Credit Suisse. The transaction's complexity and short turn-around time reportedly required a team of nearly 50 Sixth Street staff members to underwrite.

Publicly traded Business Development Company (BDC)

Sixth Street Specialty Lending (NYSE: TSLX) 
Sixth Street Specialty Lending (NYSE: TSLX) is a specialty finance company that invests in and lends to U.S. middle market companies. TSLX is managed by Sixth Street Specialty Lending Advisers, LLC, an SEC-registered investment adviser that is a part of Sixth Street. TSLX was created in 2011 and listed on the New York Stock Exchange in 2014. It has originated $16.9 billion in total financings since its inception.

Strategic partnerships

Concrete Rose Capital 
Sixth Street is a founding strategic partner of Concrete Rose Capital, an early stage investment platform focused on capitalizing underrepresented founders, investing in companies serving underrepresented consumers, and helping early stage companies build diverse teams.

Dyal Capital Partners 
In April 2017, Dyal Capital Partners made a strategic minority investment valuing Sixth Street at $3.5 billion. All proceeds from the transaction were reinvested into Sixth Street's business. In February 2021, Sixth Street filed a lawsuit against Dyal, claiming that a competitor will own a stake of the firm after Dyal merges with Owl Rock and goes public.

History 
Sixth Street was established in 2009 by a group of former Goldman Sachs colleagues led by Sixth Street CEO Alan Waxman. Sixth Street was formed to recreate the type of proprietary investing platform the group managed at Goldman.

Sixth Street was formed as a strategic partnership with TPG, which initially made $2 billion of their fund commitments available for investment by the Sixth Street team. While TPG had a minority stake in Sixth Street, the firms operated autonomously. TPG retained a passive minority ownership stake in Sixth Street, and the two firms became formally independent in May 2020.

References

Companies based in San Francisco
Financial services companies established in 2009
Investment management companies of the United States